USS Sotoyomo may refer to the following ships of the United States Navy:

  a district harbor tug laid down in 1903 and struck in 1946.
  a   serving from 1942 to 1961

United States Navy ship names